Adam Steven Barta (born September 21, 1979) is an American actor, reality star, and musician from the Bronx, New York. He has had four charting singles on the Billboard Dance Chart and is known for his duets and viral videos with Alana Thompson (Honey Boo Boo) from Here Comes Honey Boo Boo, Farrah Abraham, Margaret Cho, Nadya Suleman (Octomom), Tan Mom, Eureka O'Hara, Mariah Lynn (from Love and Hip Hop New York), and Jonah Falcon.

Barta is also known for his collaborations with Kathy Sledge (of Sister Sledge) and music videos featuring Lisa Lampanelli that have landed him in TMZ. In 2017, he starred on the WE tv series Dr. Miami. In 2018 he released a single called "Peep Me Tonight" with hip-hop star Mariahlynn.

In 2018 he released the viral hit, "Free 2 Be Me" with  "Tan Mom" Patricia Krentcil which Howard Stern called an "earworm" and "the greatest song of all time." In December, Howard announced the music video had hit over a half million views in the first few days, as one of their most viewed videos of all time.

In 2022 he created, starred in and executive produced the series #THEDISH, with "Mama June" Shannon, and featuring Tammie Brown. It premiered August 30th on Apple TV and Vudu. On October 1st, it debuted on Tubi TV. In August, Shannon went on to sue Barta on a live televised appearance, and won credit as an executive producer on the series.

Acting career 
Barta started his career doing off-Broadway theatre. He played Tash in Befriending Beau, alongside Eric Millegan. In 1999, Barta appeared in the Comedy Central series Strangers with Candy.

In 2012, he filmed scenes for his music video "Q&A" with Celebrity Apprentice's Lisa Lampanelli at the Night of a Thousand Gowns, in NYC, where he also was a headliner with her.

Music career 
Barta's first single, "I Wanna Hold You", was produced by Mike Rizzo and was picked up on Abercrombie & Fitch's official playlist.  It was Barta's first charting Billboard Dance Chart single and hit #55 on the chart. EsNtion Records signed Barta to a record deal for which his first single was "Standing in the Rain," with DJ Russ Harris. His music video hit the Number 1 spot on Logo's Click List in August, and was one of the top 10 videos of 2007. He was named favorite Click List artist of 2007  and made #96 on AfterElton.com’s Hot 100 for 2008. His video was also picked up internationally on Canada’s Only Dance Channel. The music video for "Standing in the Rain" premiered October 1, 2008 on Logo network's new mainstream dance/pop show Pop Lab, hosted by Solange and Lady Gaga. Barta hosted the Spring Break episode of Pop Lab on March 11.

In September 2009, his music video for "Standing in the Rain" was voted #1 on Logo's Ultimate Sexiest Music Video Countdown.  The music video for "VIP" was filmed in December 2009 and contains cameos from The Real World: Hollywood's Nick Brown, Project Runway's Nicholas Putvinski, Michael Musto, Reina, and Jipsta. It premiered on Pop Lab on Logo on April 13, 2010. "VIP" was featured on the premiere of season 6 episode of The Bad Girls Club and also on The Real World: Las Vegas. In January 2011, he was featured on the show Face to Face with Ke$ha on the HERE! Network, although the two were not filmed together.

His next single was with Kathy Sledge (lead singer of Sister Sledge), a dance song produced by Mike Rizzo and Mr. Mig, called "Give Yourself Up (To The Music)." It was released on June 14 on Ingrooves/Universal Dist. Sledge performed it on The Oprah Winfrey Show in April in order to promote it. In September, the song debuted on the Billboard club chart at #45*. In August, Barta filmed a music video starring reality celebrities Kim Granatell of The Real Housewives of New Jersey, Miguel Allure from Jerseylicious, Tonye 'Tone Tone' Albanese from Cake Boss, Jack Mackenroth from Project Runway, and Robin Kassner from Millionaire Matchmaker. The video featured Sledge's daughter Kristin. In May 2012 he released the music video for his single "Q&A" featuring Lisa Lampanelli, Michael Musto, Ro Bear (from NY Ink), Hailey Glassman, Kerry Schwartz, Tone Tone (from Cake Boss), Harry Legg, JC Alvarez, Ryan Nikulas (from The A-List: New York on Logo).  Shortly after in June, he signed with Gina Rodriguez of DD Entertainment. It was then announced he would be heading into the recording studio for a new single with Nadya Suleman (Octomom), after she appeared in an alternate cut of the "Q&A" music video where she was heard saying, "Let's do a duet...on my new album!" He recorded with Suleman on June 20, at Audiomaxx Studios in Cherry Hill, NJ. The song was produced by Mr. Mig and Mike Rizzo. Barta's song with Suleman was supposed to be called "Meet Me on the Dance Floor" and was slated to be released in August on Global Groove Entertainment. Barta went on "TMZ Live" in July 2012 to promote the song and talk about what it was like to record with Octomom. In August, TMZ released a controversial CD cover featuring Barta holding Octomom's breasts while she was wearing a rosary on a bed, surrounded by crosses. The pair claimed they were inspired by Madonna. The new release date for the single was also announced as September 4, 2012 and the name was changed to "Sexy Party." In October, he engaged in a heated debate for the online website deeyoon.com with Angelina Pivarnick from Jersey Shore in which he defended same-sex marriage. JWoww came to his defense, slamming Pivarnick, who later made a public apology. Then in December, he released a single with Pivarnick called "Serendipity," which the pair said was to promote equality. The song was produced by Billboard producers Majik Boys.

In 2013 he starred in three viral music videos. The music video for "Serendipity" was met with heavy criticism, being called "the world's worst music video." He also starred in Tan Mom's music video which was also called "the worst [music] video ever." His music video with Jonah Falcon for their song "It's Too Big" was featured on VH1's Best Week Ever. He appeared twice on the Howard Stern show, with both Tan Mom and Falcon, on which Stern declared he was "making a niche" for himself in entertainment. In 2013 he released a parody of the George Michael & Aretha Franklin duet "I Knew You Were Waiting for Me," called "You Seemed Shady to Me" with Pandora Boxx from RuPaul's Drag Race, which hit #46 on the iTunes Comedy Charts. He also released a song with Tan Mom on which he was featured called "Life of the Party," which E! News called "bad...really bad." He then released a song and music video with Myla Sinanaj called "I'm No Angel." Barta also released another controversial song with Sydney Leathers called "Weinerizer," which centered on Leathers' illicit sexting affair with NYC mayoral candidate Anthony Weiner.

In January 2014 he released a song "Justified" with Toby Sheldon, dedicated to Justin Bieber. In February 2014, he released the single "See U Next Tuesday" with comedian Margaret Cho. It hit the top 75 on the iTunes comedy singles chart. In February 2015 it was announced Barta was releasing a new song and music video called "Movin Up" with Alana Thompson (aka Honey Boo Boo) and her sister Pumpkin. The song was released in 2016 and Barta was credited as creating the viral craze "the Honey Boo Boo bop".

In 2016 he formed the group "The Pool Kids" with dance artist SK8, and the pair achieved a Billboard dance club charting single, "Heartbreak Hotline", peaking at #17 on the chart.  In 2017 he appeared on WE tv's Dr. Miami, where he got surgery, and also collaborated on a new song "Flawless", after the doctor told him it was his dream to be on the Billboard charts. The single debuted on the Billboard dance singles chart in April and peaked at #24. It also peaked at #32 on the Billboard dance club chart. He also released a song and music video with RuPaul's Drag Race season 9 contestant, Eureka O'Hara called "Body Positivity"'. The music video featured Farrah Abraham, who he previously had been suing for music royalties.

In 2018 it was announced he was releasing a single with Mariahlynn from Love and Hip Hop New York, with Dr. Miami, and featuring Reina, called "Peep Me Tonight".

Later that year he released a new single called "Free 2 Be Me" with Patricia Krentcil (Tan Mom), and performed it live on the Howard Stern Show. Howard said he "couldn't get it out of his head for days".

Jimmy Kimmel and Ike Barinholtz both claimed they loved Barta on the song and couldn't get it out of their heads. Later in the year, Barta appeared on the Stern Show playing Family Feud with Patricia and won. Howard announced the music video had achieved over 500,000 views in a few days.

Chart singles

References

External links
 
 
 
 

Living people
1979 births
American male singer-songwriters
American gay actors
American gay musicians
American LGBT singers
People from the Bronx
21st-century American male singers
21st-century American singers
20th-century American LGBT people
21st-century American LGBT people
Singer-songwriters from New York (state)